Brian Belcher is a Canadian social scientist, currently a Canada Research Chair in Sustainability Research Effectiveness at Royal Roads University. From October through December 2015 he was a Fellow at the Durham University Institute of Advanced Study.

References

Year of birth missing (living people)
Living people
Academic staff of the Royal Roads University
Canadian sociologists
Fellows of the Institute of Advanced Study (Durham)